Duke is the twenty-eighth studio album by American keyboardist and record producer George Duke. The single "T-Jam" was nominated for the Grammy Award for Best Pop Instrumental Performance.

Track listing 
All tracks are written by George Duke unless otherwise noted.

Charts

References 

2005 albums
George Duke albums
albums produced by George Duke